Muhammad Akhlaq Ahmed (born 1971) was a Pakistani field hockey player. He won a bronze medal at the 1992 Summer Olympics in Barcelona. He died of cancer on 25 November 2016 at the age 45.

The 45-year-old was diagnosed with cancer following a dental procedure in Malaysia a few months ago. Since then he had been receiving treatment but his health deteriorated   and he was admitted at the CMH Hospital in Lahore where he died.

References

 http://tribune.com.pk/story/1244370/another-gem-lost-olympian-akhlaq-loses-battle-cancer/

External links
 

1971 births
2016 deaths
Pakistani male field hockey players
Olympic field hockey players of Pakistan
Field hockey players at the 1992 Summer Olympics
Olympic bronze medalists for Pakistan
Olympic medalists in field hockey
Medalists at the 1992 Summer Olympics
Place of birth missing